The Great Hall of Università Cattolica del Sacro Cuore, Italy, is one of the principal structures of the University, with a public interior used for formal ceremonies, conferences, recitals and lessons.

History

Bramante projected the two Cloisters of Sant'Ambrogio and between them built a refectory. The refectory was painted by Callisto Piazza, who provident in 1545 to adorn the wall with a magnificent fresco, still visible, showing the "Wedding at Cana". The facade and the statue of Christ the King are recent additions and designed by the architect Muzio. Since the 1930s the hall has undergone a major restoration to be used as great hall of UCSC.

Function
The great hall is one of the main structures of the university. In addition to this main hall, there are others located in the satellite campuses in (Rome, Brescia, Piacenza and Campobasso). Every year in this room there is the inauguration of the academic year. International conferences are also held here and have featured participants like Mario Draghi, Romano Prodi, Tony Blair, Mario Monti, Giorgio Napolitano, José Manuel Barroso and others.

See also
Università Cattolica del Sacro Cuore
Callisto Piazza

References

External links
 3D pictures and panoramas of great hall
 UCSC 'Official website

Università Cattolica del Sacro Cuore
Buildings and structures in Milan